Carvin & Ivan are a production duo from Philadelphia consisting of producers and songwriters Ivan "Orthodox" Barias and Carvin "Ransum" Haggins. Initially starting out as solo hip hop artists, Haggins and Barias moved into production and songwriting. They have written and produced songs for Jazmine Sullivan, Jill Scott, Musiq Soulchild, Justin Timberlake, Mario, Chris Brown, Ledisi, Raheem DeVaughn, Keyshia Cole, Jaheim, Estelle, Floetry, Skillz, Ace Hood, Rick Ross and others.

They are notable for introducing Musiq Soulchild to the world and giving him his staple sound.  They are responsible for writing and producing the vast majority of Musiq's more popular charted singles such as "Just Friends (Sunny)", "Halfcrazy", "Dontchange", "B.U.D.D.Y.", "Teachme" and others.

Ivan currently serves on the board of governors and is the president of the Philadelphia Chapter of The Recording Academy. On February 1, 2011, Carvin & Ivan became creative ambassadors for the city of Philadelphia as a part of Greater Philadelphia Tourism Marketing Corporation's Philly 360°.

Early years and history 
Carvin & Ivan met in the mid 1990s at A Touch Of Jazz, a recording studio in Philadelphia owned by DJ Jazzy Jeff.

In 2011, Ivan was selected as an ambassador of the Philadelphia 76ers community program La Liga del Barrio.

Discography

1997
Kenny Lattimore - Love Jones: The Music
 "Can't Get Enough" (produced by Carvin Haggins and Kenny Lattimore)

1998
Kenny Lattimore - From the Soul of Man
 "Destiny" (produced by Kenny Lattimore, Vidal Davis and Carvin Haggins)

2000

Musiq Soulchild - Aijuswanaseing
"Girl Next Door" (produced by Carvin Haggins with Andre Harris)
"Love" (produced by Carvin Haggins with Andre Harris)
"You And Me" (produced by Carvin Haggins with Andre Harris)
"Just Friends (Sunny)" 
"143" (produced by Carvin Haggins with Keith Pelzer)
"Seventeen" (produced by Carvin Haggins with Andre Harris)
"Poparatzi"

Jill Scott - Who Is Jill Scott? Words and Sounds Vol. 1
"Honey Molasses"

2001

Jill Scott - Experience: Jill Scott 826+
"High Post Brotha" (featuring Common)
"Gimme"

Angie Stone - Mahogany Soul
"The Ingredients Of Love" (featuring Musiq Soulchild)

Lina - Stranger on Earth
"Bye Bye Baby" (produced by Ivan "Orthodox" Barias)

2002

Musiq Soulchild - Juslisen
"Newness"
"Caughtup"
"Stopplayin"
"Halfcrazy"
"Time"
"Solong"
"Bestfriend"
"Dontchange"
"Something"
"Ifiwouldaknew"

Dawn Robinson - Dawn
"Party, Party"
"Get Up Again"

Floetry - Floetic
"Headache"
"Opera"

Syleena Johnson - "Chapter 2: The Voice"
"Dear You"
"I'm Gon Cry"
"No Words"
"So Willingly"

2003

Musiq Soulchild - Soulstar
"Youloveme"
"Womanopoly"
"Forthenight"
"Infatueighties"
"Whoknows"
"Babymother"
"Missyou"
"Thereason"
"Romancipation"
"Givemorelove"

Joe - And Then...
"Ride Wit U (featuring G-Unit)
"Another Used To Be"
"Testify"

2004

Jill Scott - Beautifully Human: Words and Sounds Vol. 2
"Bedda At Home"
"Family Reunion"

Mario - Turning Point
"Like Me Real Hard"

Planet Asia - The Grand Opening
"Pure Coke" (featuring Martin Luther)

Skillz - Okayplayer - True Notes Vol. 1
"Take It Back"

Toshinobu Kubota - Time to Share
"Breaking Through"
"Hope You'll Be Well"

2005

Faith Evans - The First Lady
"Again"
"I Don't Need It"
"Stop'n'Go"
"Jealous"
"Get Over You"
"Until You Came"

Chris Brown - Chris Brown's Journey
"So Glad"

Brian McKnight - Gemini
"She"

2006

2pac- Pac's Life
"Playa Cardz Right (Female)" (Feat: Keyshia Cole)
"Scared Straight"

Heather Headley - In My Mind
"Losing you"
Keshia Chanté - 2U (album)
 "Kiss"

2007

Musiq Soulchild - Luvanmusiq
"Teachme" (Grammy Nominated Song: R&B Song of The Year 2008)
"Rewind"

2pac- Best of 2Pac Part 2: Life
"Dopefiend's Diner" (Previously Unreleased)

Freeway - Free at Last
"This Can't Be Real" (Feat: Marsha Ambrosius)

2008

Raheem DeVaughn - Love Behind the Melody
"Customer" (Grammy Nominated Song: R&B Song Of The Year 2009)

Jazmine Sullivan - Fearless
"Foolish Heart"

Keyshia Cole - A Different Me
"Playa Cardz Right" (featuring 2Pac)

Skillz- The Million Dollar Backpack
"Don't Act Like You Don't Know" (featuring Freeway)

2009

Musiq Soulchild - OnMyRadio
"ifyouleave" (featuring Mary J. Blige)
"deserveumore"
"special"
"someone"

Ledisi - Turn Me Loose
"Alone"
"I Need Love"

Ace Hood - Ruthless
"Champion" (featuring Jazmine Sullivan and Rick Ross)

Amerie - In Love & War
"The Flowers"

2010

Jaheim - Another Round
"Finding My Way Back"

Faith Evans - Something About Faith
"Gone Already"

Skillz - The World Needs More Skillz
"Celebrate Life"
"Wants and Needs" (feat. Bilal)

Leela James - My Soul
"If It's Wrong"
"It's Over"

2011

Ledisi - Pieces Of Me
"I Gotta Get To You"

Jill Scott - The Original Jill Scott from the Vault, Vol. 1
"I Don't Know (Gotta Have You)"

2012

Estelle - All of Me
"The Life"

SWV - I Missed Us
"Love Unconditionally"

Kenny Lattimore - Back To Cool
"Find A Way"

Alex Boyd - Commit Me
"Wish I Knew"

Tamia - Beautiful Surprise
"Still Love You"

Curt Chambers - One Way Ticket  (entire album produced by Ivan Barias & Curt Chambers)
One Way Ticket 
Hollywood 
Grass Is Greener 
Keep Calling (featuring Gilbere Forte) 
Out Of Body Prelude 
Out Of Body 
Out Of Body Outro 
Loaded Gun 
Loaded Gun Outro 
Desert Dry 
Desert Dry Outro 
Digging For Gold 
New America Prelude 
New America 
Incredible Redux

Q. Parker - The MANual
 "Belongs to You"
 "Completely"

2013

Chrisette Michelle - Better
"Let Me Win"
"Love Won't Leave Me Out"

Raheem DeVaughn - A Place Called Loveland
"Interlude - Album Intro"
"Love Connection"
"Wrong Forever" 
"Complicated"

TGT - 3 Kings 
"Burn Out" (produced by Carvin Haggins and Ivan Barias with Javad Day)

Glenn Lewis - Moment of Truth
"Random Thoughts"
"Up & Down"
"Searching For That One"
"Closer" (co-produced by Stan Drinks)
"I Wanna Go Deep"

2014

Ledisi - The Truth
"88 Boxes"

2015
Kenny Lattimore - Anatomy of a Love Song
 "Find a Way"
 "You Have My Heart"
 "What Must I Do"

2017
Bell Biv DeVoe - Three Stripes
"One More Try" (featuring Boyz II Men)

Stokley - Introducing Stokley
 "Organic"
 "Think About U"
 "Cross The Line"
 "Art In Motion"
 "U & I" (featuring Estelle)
 "We/Me"

Ledisi - Let Love Rule
 "Forgiveness" (produced by Ivan Barias)

Awards and nominations

Grammy Awards

|-
|  || "Love"|| Best Male R&B Vocal Performance || 
|-
| rowspan="2"|  || "Halfcrazy" || Best Male R&B Vocal Performance || 
|-
| Juslisen || Best R&B Album || 
|-
|rowspan="1"|  || Turning Point || Best Contemporary R&B Album || 
|-
| rowspan="3"|  || "Teachme" || Best R&B Song || 
|-
|  "B.U.D.D.Y." || Best Male R&B Vocal Performance || 
|-
| Luvanmusiq || Best R&B Album || 
|-
| rowspan="2"|  || "Customer" || Best R&B Song || 
|-
| Fearless || Best Contemporary R&B Album || 
|-
| rowspan="2"|  ||"IfULeave"  || Best R&B Performance by a Duo or Group with Vocals || 
|-
| Turn Me Loose || Best R&B Album || 
|-
| rowspan="5"|  || "Finding My Way Back"  || Best R&B Song || 
|-
| "Finding My Way Back" || Best Male R&B Vocal Performance || 
|-
| "Gone Already" || Best Female R&B Vocal Performance || 
|-
| Another Round || Best R&B Album || 
|-
| The Love & War MasterPeace || Best R&B Album || 
|-
| rowspan="1"|  || Pieces of Me || Best R&B Album || 
|-
| rowspan="2"|  || Better || Best R&B Album || 
|-
| Three Kings || Best R&B Album ||

Ascap Awards
ASCAP Rhythm & Soul Awards
2002 R&B Song of The Year: "Love"
2002 "Just Friends (Sunny)"
2003 "Halfcrazy"
2004 "Dontchange"
2008 "B.U.D.D.Y."
2008 "Teachme"
2010 "IfULeave"
2011 "Finding My Way Back"

References

External links

 Carvin & Ivan at Forever Music Inc
 Interview, HitQuarters Dec 2002
 Official website of Carvin Haggins

Hip hop record producers